Peter Joseph Savelberg (10 February 1827, Heerlen – 11 February 1907, Heerlen) was a Roman-Catholic priest and congregation founder (missionary).

Biography
Peter Savelberg attended school in Heerlen and after that at Rolduc (1843 to 1845).  Leaving his brother Balthasar Savelberg, who was in charge of a glassmaking shop in Brussels, he returned to Heerlen because he could not adjust.  Between 1846 and 1849 he attended Rolduc yet again, and after 1849 he gave seminars in Roermond.  In 1852, Savelberg was made priest, his first task was as a teacher at the Bischoppelijk College in Roermond (1853–1856).

In 1856 he became rector of the Franciscans of Heythuysen, for whom he worked at the girl pension Nonnenwerth close to Bonn.  In 1863 the bishop called him back and made him chaplain in Schaesberg and in 1865 of the Saint Pancras parish in Heerlen.

1827 births
1907 deaths
People from Heerlen
19th-century Dutch Roman Catholic priests
Venerated Catholics by Pope John Paul II